Paul Bablot (20 November 1873 Boulogne-sur-Seine – 23 December 1932 Marseille) was a French racecar driver.  He also owned an early French-built Wright-model airplane.

He later became a track builder and designed the Circuit of Miramas which held the French Grand Prix in 1926.

See also
1926 Grand Prix season
1919 Indianapolis 500
1906 Targa Florio

References

1873 births
1932 deaths
French racing drivers
Indianapolis 500 drivers
French Grand Prix
Sportspeople from Boulogne-Billancourt